Dongou is a district in the Likouala Region of north-eastern Republic of the Congo. The capital lies at Dongou.

Towns and villages
Dongou
Enyellé

References

Likouala Department
Districts of the Republic of the Congo